Hellinsia cinerarius is a moth of the family Pterophoridae. It is found in Chile.

The forewings are grey white, speckled with small blackish dots between the veins near the costa.

References

Moths described in 1864
cinerarius
Moths of South America
Fauna of Chile
Endemic fauna of Chile